Ducherow is a railway station in the town of Ducherow, Mecklenburg-Vorpommern, Germany. The station lies on the Angermünde–Stralsund railway and the train services are operated by Deutsche Bahn. The station received new platforms in 2005.

Train services

The station is served by the following service:
Regional services  Stralsund - Greifswald - Pasewalk - Angermünde - Berlin - Ludwigsfelde - Jüterbog - Falkenberg - Elsterwerda

References

Railway stations in Mecklenburg-Western Pomerania
Buildings and structures in Vorpommern-Greifswald
Railway stations in Germany opened in 1863
1863 establishments in Prussia